Uacaba is a village in the Gabú Region of central-eastern Guinea-Bissau.

Location
It lies between Cancurdo to the west, and Canjia to the east.

References

External links
Maplandia World Gazetteer

Populated places in Guinea-Bissau
Gabu Region